Robbie Dickson is a British-Canadian engineer and entrepreneur who worked with racers Bill Drossos and Jacques Villeneuve to invigorate the Canadian racing industry through the creation of Area 27, an F1 racetrack and Canadian.

Early life and education
Dickson was born in the United Kingdom. As a child he was taken to see the film Cannonball Run, and immediately became fascinated with super cars. He went on to pursue his passion and eventually graduated with an engineering degree from the University of Wales.

Career
Upon graduating, he worked in various engineering positions for automotive companies including BMW, Isuzu and Ford, eventually being recruited to work as an engine designer by Westport Innovations in Vancouver.

In early 2000, he competed in the Race the Base Event in Cold Lake Alberta. There he went 326km/h (202.5mph) in his Lamborghini Aventador, leading to him nearly avoiding a crash as his car spun out of control. At this point, Dickson decided to design a more efficient braking system than the hydraulic brakes that came standard in most super cars. Being an engineer by trade, he started to examine the braking systems of other fast-moving vehicles such as trucks and trains. These vehicles relied on an air brake system that was more efficient, for it did not require fluid to be retained and allowed the storage of potential energy. He utilised the design as an auxiliary brake to be applied when speeds greater than 100km/h are reached.

Firgelli Automations
Seeing a potential to fulfil an industry demand for enhanced safety, Dickson founded the company Attivo Design in order to market his auxiliary air brake.  The technology used for Attivo was from his other company he founded in 2004 and is the sole owner and shareholder of. Based around technology he invented, Firgelli Automations manufactures Home Automations and media hardware.

Area 27 and Cannonball Run
Dickson's love of the film Cannonball Run inspired him to team up with Bill Dorosso and the Canadian F1 legend Jacques Villeneuve to create Canada's first and only full sized racetrack, Area-27. The track derived its name from Jacques' racing number.

Dickson's group negotiated with the Osoyoos Indian Band for a lease on the land the 4.9km track would be built on. GPS guided earth movers traced the layout of the track, and 12,139 feet of concrete was used on the track and its barriers. A special blend of asphalt was made to withstand the heat of the region.

Dickson invested in the track to inspire like-minded drivers to race their track cars. The heightened popularity of the track allowed it to evolve from a simple race track to a full sized racing community that even featured a racing school, Academy-27, with such notable instructors as Canadian Motorsport Hall of Fame Richard Spenard.

Dickson also created a number of races that send drivers throughout Canadian countryside for the sheer joy of driving, including co-founding the Canadian Bullrun Rally, a seven-day tour of the Rocky Mountains for luxury car owners. He also co-founded the annual Diamond Rally, an invite-only charity rally of 200 super cars, the largest super car rally in North America, sponsored by Hublot Vancouver one of Dickson's other ventures. The rally raises money for dozens of charities and runs from Vancouver to Whistler and the Okanagan via the Sea-to-Sky Highway.

Venture capitalist
Dickson has provided the guidance and financial backing for numerous businesses, including helping De Beers Diamond expand into Canada through the opening of their first jewellery store. He is an angel investor, who believes in a clean-tech future and only works with companies that are environmentally friendly and believe in a zero-emission future. He has backed Etalim, Inc and other companies that create technology Dickson believes will have a practical application in the future.

Personal life
Dickson is an avid car collector, and has owned hundreds of automobiles in his lifetime. The first brand new car he ever purchased was a custom Lamborghini Aventador Roadster.  In 2011, The Vancouver Sun profiled Dickson and his $1,000,000 garage renovation complete with 120 spotlights, a full-size bar, and a lifelike fibreglass model of Michael Schumacher's F1 Ferrari.

References

Alumni of the University of Wales
Living people
Year of birth missing (living people)